There is no real institution in the United States that bears the exact name University of New York.  However, it is possible that such a reference may be used for one of the following:

 New York University, a private research university in New York City, originally named the University of the City of New York
 State University of New York, a multi-campus public university system
 City University of New York, a multi-campus public university system 
 University of New York, a fictional university in the American TV series Felicity (1998 – 2002), modelled on New York University
 University of New York in Prague, Czech Republic
 University of New York, Tirana, Albania
 University of the State of New York, or the Board of Regents, the State of New York’s umbrella organization for education regulation; not a university in the ordinary sense

For a more comprehensive list of universities and other educational institutions in the State of New York or New York City, see any of the following articles:
 List of colleges and universities in New York City
 List of colleges and universities in New York (state)
 Education in New York City
 Education in New York (state)

See also
 College of the City of New York (disambiguation)
 New York College (disambiguation)

Universities and colleges
New York University
Universities and colleges in New York City